Dhimaner Dinkaal is a Bengali Comedy Web series that premiered on 11 December 2017 on ALT Balaji. It is the story about a simple Bengali man who is against mobile and social media.

The series is available for streaming on the ALT Balaji App and its associated websites since its release date.

Plot
The series is about an uber simple Bengali family man, Dhiman Dutta (Saswata Chatterjee) who meets a seductress on social media! It is a story that explores the strength of familial ties, culture, and good old Indian values and explains the side effects of social media.

Cast
 Saswata Chatterjee as Dhiman Dutta
 Sreelekha Mitra as Anushila
 Kharaj Mukherjee as Khoraj
 Sudipta Banerjee as Priyangini/Bipasha
 Kalyani Mondal as Jaya
 Kushal Chakraborty as Sutanu
 Poonam Basak as Mithali
 Tapan Ganguly as Office Boss
 Kamal Ghosh as Ghosh Babu
 Mayna Banerjee as Lily
 Priya Dutt as Munni

Episodes
 Episode 1: Boss Er Dhakka Phone Pakka
 Episode 2: Digital Mayajaal
 Episode 3: Lukochuri
 Episode 4: Aro Kacha Kachi Aro Kachey ...
 Episode 5: Sareer Geroy Porla Dhora
 Episode 6: E Ki Holo Keno Holo
 Episode 7: Ebar Porlo Dhora
 Episode 8: Tori Ki Ebar Dublo
 Episode 9: Khela Bhangar Khela
 Episode 10: Abar Mongol Sukro Chalu?

References

External links
 Watch Dhimaner Dinkaal on ALT Balaji website
 

2017 web series debuts
ALTBalaji original programming
Indian comedy web series
Bengali-language web series